Acefylline clofibrol is a derivative of acefylline and clofibrate used as a hypolipidemic agent.

References 

Acetate esters